The U.S. Army Corps of Engineers Superintendent's House and Workmen's Office, in Woodbury Park, Woodbury, Kentucky, was listed on the National Register of Historic Places in 1980.

The listing is for two buildings on a high bluff:
the superintendent's house (1912–13), a  two-story Flemish bond brick house with a wraparound porch, and
a one-and-a-half-story office Flemish bond brick building (c.1889)
They are located on Federal Hill, overlooking Lock and Dam #4 of the Green River, within an  Butler County park.

At the time of the 1980 NRHP nomination, the buildings had been vacant since 1973, when the U.S. Army Corps of Engineers moved its last employee out of Woodbury.

See also
Finney Hotel, 1890 hotel also in Woodbury Park and NRHP-listed

References

National Register of Historic Places in Butler County, Kentucky
Government buildings completed in 1913
1913 establishments in Kentucky
Unused buildings in Kentucky
1889 establishments in Kentucky
Government buildings completed in 1889
Office buildings completed in 1889
Houses completed in 1913
United States Army Corps of Engineers